Moskal-Charivnyk (Muscovite Wizard), is a 1995 musical comedy by the Ukrainian filmmaker Mykola Zasieyev-Rudenko based on the book by Ukrainian writer Ivan Kotliarevskyi. The film features a detailed portrayal of Ukrainian culture, showing the beauty of Ukrainian  traditions, music, costumes, and language.

Plot
The story takes place in Ukraine at the start of 19th century. It shows how a local clerk, Fintyk, tries to seduce a female farmer, Tetyana, whose husband, Mykhailo, as a Chumak left for Crimea for nine weeks to transport salt. The couple was taken by surprise when a Russian army soldier came over and asked for a stay. All soldiers, if they were not cossacks and, of course, did not speak Ukrainian, in Ukraine were called moskali (moskal – singular) hence the name of the movie. The young lady tries to cover up her out-of-marriage relationship and let the soldier to stay for rest. When Mykhailo arrives soon thereafter she hides the clerk. Moskal knew that something is going on between Tetyana and Fintyk yet he finds a common ground with his hostess. They agreed to get rid of the clerk yet not to spoil her marriage. Then there are few scenes that reflect the peculiar inter-ethnic relationship between Ukrainians and Russians in face of the soldier. By the end of the movie the soldier finally pulls the clerk out of a hiding place while Mykhailo is blacking out whether out of a liquor or being shocked realizing the situation. In the last scene everybody explains to Mykhailo what have really happened and why. The husband gets really mad and has an intent to kill everybody, but moskal steps in just in time to defuse the situation.

Cast
Tetyana – Ruslana Pysanka
Mykhailo – Oleksandr Bodnarenko
Moskal – Bohdan Beniuk
Fintyk – Kostiantyn Shaforenko
Georgy Drozd

Awards 

 1996 — Audience Choice Award "Crystal Angel" IFF in Slavutych, Ukraine;
 1996 — Second prize of the festival and the prize of spectator sympathies of the IFF in Gatchina, Russia;
 1997 — Prize "For the funniest film" of the Yalta IFF, Ukraine.

External links
ukrainatv.com

Moskal-Charivnyk on Youtube

1995 films
Dovzhenko Film Studios films
Ukrainian musical films
Ukrainian-language films
Ukrainian comedy films